Vincenzo Albanese (born 12 November 1996 in Oliveto Citra) is an Italian cyclist who currently rides for UCI ProTeam . He was named in the start list for the 2017 Giro d'Italia.

Major results

2014
 2nd Trofeo San Rocco
 6th Trofeo Buffoni
2015
 7th Ruota d'Oro
 9th Gran Premio della Liberazione
2016
 1st Trofeo Edil C
 1st Gran Premio della Liberazione
 1st Trofeo Matteotti
 1st Ruota d'Oro
 Tour de l'Avenir
1st  Points classification
1st Stage 1
 2nd Road race, National Under-23 Road Championships
 5th Overall Oberösterreich Rundfahrt
1st Stage 1
 7th Road race, UEC European Under-23 Road Championships
2017
 5th Road race, UCI Under-23 Road World Championships
2018
 9th Coppa Bernocchi
2020
 5th Trofeo Matteotti
2021
 2nd Memorial Marco Pantani
 5th Coppa Ugo Agostoni
 6th Giro del Veneto
 10th Overall Tour du Limousin
 Giro d'Italia
Held  after Stages 2–3
2022
 1st Stage 4 Tour du Limousin
 3rd Trofeo Calvià
 4th Overall Tour of Slovenia
 4th Overall CRO Race
 6th Coppa Sabatini
 7th Overall Giro di Sicilia
 9th Clásica de Almería
 10th Clàssica Comunitat Valenciana 1969

Grand Tour general classification results timeline

References

External links

1996 births
Living people
Italian male cyclists
Sportspeople from the Province of Salerno
Cyclists from Campania
21st-century Italian people